Bernathonomus postrosea is a moth of the family Erebidae. It is found in Peru.

References

Moths described in 2011
Phaegopterina